Mavia may refer to:

Mavia (queen), the warrior-queen of the Bedouin Saracens in the fourth century CE
Mavia (genus), a classification of insects
"Mavia", a character from Love from a Stranger (1947 film)